Catherine Gide (18 April 1923 – 20 April 2013) was a French writer and editor. She was the daughter of André Gide and Elisabeth van Rysselberghe, daughter of Théo van Rysselberghe.

Biography
Catherine Gide was born in Annecy, France, on 18 April 1923. She was the natural daughter and only child of André Gide, Nobel Prize for Literature, and Elisabeth van Rysselberghe (daughter of Maria and painter Théo van Rysselberghe). She was recognized by her father on the death of Madeleine, wife of André Gide, and adopted on 26 July 1938. She first married the Germanist and academic  (1914–1999); their son Nicolas, born in 1947, died young in a traffic accident, in 1986. They had three more children, Isabelle (born in 1945), Dominique (born in 1948), and Sophie.

Gide later remarried to Pierre Desvignes. After his death she married the academic , a specialist in André Gide and his entourage.

In 2009 she published the collection of interviews Entretiens 2002-2003. With this publication, Catherine Gide shared for the first time personal memories about her childhood, while the public was presented with information about Gide's role as father, which before the release of this work had been scarcely documented in secondary literature. Gide also edited, among others, Lettres à la Petite Dame : un petit à la campagne, juin 1924-décembre 1926, published by Éditions Gallimard in 2000.

Catherine Gide lived for a long time in Cabris (Maritime Alps) in her vacation home.

The Fondation Catherine Gide was created in 2007 at her initiative. It is headquartered in Switzerland. Its purpose is to "keep the memory of André Gide and of his time alive", fostering the "literary and cultural heritage of the author". In 2019 the foundation organized an exhibition in Paris on the occasion of the 150th anniversary of the birth of André Gide together with the Gallimard Gallery of Paris, the Fondation des Treilles, and the Musée Georges-Borias d’Uzès.

Catherine Gide died on 20 April 2013 in Olten (German-speaking Switzerland), at the age of 90.

Bibliography
 Élisabeth Van Rysselberghe, Lettres à la Petite Dame : un petit à la campagne, juin 1924-décembre 1926, texts chosen and presented by Catherine Gide, Gallimard, 2000 
 Théo Van Rysselberghe intime, exposition, Le Lavandou, Espace culturel, 8 July-18 September 2005, catalogue : Catherine Gide, Raphaël Dupouy, Jean-Paul Monery, Peter Schnyder 
 André Gide, Le Ramier, foreword by Catherine Gide, preface by Jean-Claude Perrier, afterword by David H. Walker, Gallimard, 2002
 Maria van Rysselberghe, « L'Enfant Catherine », La Nouvelle Revue française, n° 580, January 2007, pp. 108–130
 Théo Van Rysselberghe, Catherine Gide, Théo Van Rysselberghe intime, Réseau Lalan, 2002, 
 Catherine Gide, Entretiens 2002-2003, Gallimard, 2009

References

1923 births
2013 deaths
20th-century French writers
21st-century French writers
People from Annecy